Alexandre "Sacha" Distel (29 January 1933 – 22 July 2004) was a French singer, guitarist, songwriter and actor who had hits with a cover version of "Raindrops Keep Falling on My Head" in 1970, which reached No 10 in the UK Charts, "Scoubidou", and "The Good Life". He was made Chevalier (Knight) of the Légion d'honneur in 1997. He had also scored a hit as a songwriter when Tony Bennett recorded Sacha's song for The Good Life in 1963. It peaked at #18 on Billboard's Hot 100 chart and Top 10 on the Easy Listening chart.

Career
Distel was the son of Russian-French emigre Léonide Distel who was born in Odessa (Russian Empire) and French-Jewish pianist Andrée Ventura (1902–1965), born in Constantinople. His uncle was bandleader Ray Ventura. After Ventura settled in Paris with his orchestra Les Collégiens, Distel gave up piano and switched to guitar.

During his career, Distel worked with Kenny Clarke, Jimmy Gourley, Lionel Hampton, Slide Hampton, Bobby Jaspar, Barney Kessel, John Lewis, Pierre Michelot, Bernard Peiffer, Henri Renaud, Fats Sadi,  Art Simmons, Martial Solal, René Urtreger, and Barney Wilen.

Personal life
Distel was involved with actress Brigitte Bardot in 1958, having invited her to his birthday party in Saint-Tropez. The relationship ended in 1959. He married championship Olympic skier Francine Bréaud in 1963. Distel publicly stated that he remained faithful to his wife: "Anything I want in a woman I can get at home."

Distel died of cancer at the age of 71 on 22 July 2004 at his mother in law's home in Rayol-Canadel, near Saint-Tropez, France. In an interview a month after Distel's death, his widow Francine said she knew he had been unfaithful: "I knew it was going to happen and I knew it was going to pass."

Discography
 Afternoon in Paris with John Lewis (Atlantic, 1957)
 Everybody Loves the Lover (Philips, 1961)
 From Paris with Love (RCA Victor, 1962)
 Les Filles Moi J'Aime Ca! (RCA, 1963)
 The Good Life (Kapp, 1969)
 Back to Jazz with Slide Hampton (La Voix de Son Maitre, 1969)
 Sacha Distel (Warner Bros., 1970)
 Close to You (Warner Bros., 1970)
 More and More (Warner Bros., 1971)
 Love Music (Polydor, 1973)
 Swing with Sacha Distel (Contour, 1973)
 Love Is All (Pye, 1976)
 Forever and Ever (Carrere, 1978)
 From Sacha with Love (Mercury, 1979)
 Amour Tout Court (DRG, 1982)
 My Guitar and All That Jazz (Pablo, 1983)
 Move Closer (Towerbell, 1985)
 Ecoute Mes Yeux (Arcade Music, 1998)
 But Beautiful (Mercury Records, 2003)

References

1933 births
2004 deaths
Musicians from Paris
French people of Russian descent
French people of Jewish descent
French jazz guitarists
French male guitarists
20th-century French Jews
Chevaliers of the Légion d'honneur
20th-century guitarists
20th-century French male singers
French male jazz musicians